The OLA insurgency is an armed conflict between the Oromo Liberation Army (OLA), which split from the Oromo Liberation Front (OLF) in 2018, and the Ethiopian National Defense Force (ENDF), continuing in the context of the long-term Oromo conflict, typically dated to have started with the formation of the Oromo Liberation Front in 1973.

Background
 
The Oromo conflict dates back to at least the formation of the Oromo Liberation Front in 1973, evolving from the Bale Revolt that started in the 1960s in response to perceived injustices by the groups in power against Oromo people.

In August 2018, the OLF made peace settlements with the Ethiopian government, along with several other groups, including the Ogaden National Liberation Front and Ginbot 7. The OLF leadership agreed to disarm its soldiers within 15 days of their arrival in Addis Ababa. According to then-OLF leader Ibsa Negewo, the OLF claimed to have 1,305 soldiers in Eritrea and 4,000 in West and South Oromia. The men stationed in Eritrea agreed to disarm but most of those in Oromia refused to do so despite their leaders’ wishes. One leader, Kumsa Diriba, also known as "Jaal Maro", failed to reach a deal with the government and after a falling out with the OLF, he split away from the OLF and formed OLF–Shene, also known as the Oromo Liberation Army (OLA). Security forces promised to crush the group within two weeks but haven't been able to do so even after 5 years of fighting.

Timeline 

During the two years following its 2018 split with the OLF, OLA killed 700 civilians in the East and West Guji Zones according to Haaji Umar Nagessa, a "veteran freedom fighter and tribal leader", who was assassinated by the OLA on 4 April 2020.

Relation to Tigray War

In March 2021 during the Tigray War, a division of the Eritrean Defence Forces left Tigray Region and arrived in Oromia Region to fight against the Oromo Liberation Army (OLA), according to Freedom Friday. On 11 August 2021 the OLA leader Kumsa Diriba announced that the group had formed an alliance with Tigray People's Liberation Front (TPLF) and that there were plans among opposition groups to establish a "grand coalition" against prime minister Abiy Ahmed, himself an Oromo.

During Irreechaa celebrations in early October, protestors chanted against Abiy Ahmed and in favour of OLA commander Jaal Marroo. By late October, the OLA controlled much of the former Wollega province. On 31 October, the OLA took control of Kamisee in the Oromia Zone of the Amhara Region, at the same time as the Tigray Defense Forces took control of Kombolcha, about 50 kilometres to the north.

On 1 November, OLA Commander-in-Chief Jaal Marroo said that the OLA had taken "several towns in western, central, and southern Oromia, facing little resistance from government forces who were retreating."

During early and mid-November 2021, a TDF–OLA joint offensive took several towns in North Shewa zone of Amhara Region along a major road leading south from Tigray Region to the Ethiopian capital Addis Ababa, appearing to threaten a military attack on Addis Ababa.

See also
 Ethnic discrimination in Ethiopia

References

2021 in Ethiopia
Ethiopian civil conflict (2018–present)
Rebellions in Ethiopia